Perfect is a children's novel by American author Natasha Friend, first published in 2004 by Milkweed Editions. Perfect won the  Milkweed Prize for Children's Literature in 2004. This book is about a young girl's struggle with bulimia nervosa.

Plot summary
Isabelle Lee is a 13-year-old girl with an eating disorder. The disorder developed over time after the death of her father when her mother begins to send her to group therapy. She soon realizes that the most popular girl in school, Ashley Barnum, goes to the group and begins to be friends with her.

Themes
Towards the end of the book, Isabelle realizes that nobody is perfect. Even the pretty, nice, and smart have problems and are not perfect themselves, even if they seem that way. She learns to cope with her father's death and accepts the fact that no one is perfect...

Coping
Isabelle had developed the eating disorder of bulimia nervosa due to her problems with coping.  Her father had died two years prior to her eating disorder.  Isabelle felt as if she could not deal or cope with her father’s death.  This was because she felt as if she did not have the full support of her mother because her mom stayed in her bed depressed.  Problems coping with death or things that are stressful are linked as onsets to eating disorders such as bulimia nervosa in Isabelle’s case.  Her eating disorder was the only way she felt as if she could control what was taking place in her life, since she could not control the death of her father.

Loneliness
Isabelle experienced the feeling of loneliness especially after her father's death.  She did not necessarily feel accepted by others at her school especially by the popular girls and the guys in her classes.  This made her experience loneliness in a social aspect of her life not including the loneliness she felt within her own home.  Isabelle felt as if she was by herself when it came to dealing with her father's death because her mother never wanted to talk about the death. This lack of communication within Isabelle's family had a lot to do with the fact that she reached out to binge eating as a source of comfort during her times of struggle. Many people who experience eating disorders whether it be anorexia or bulimia nervosa have dealt with feeling lonely within social situations.

Early trauma
Isabelle was trying to cope with her father's death in the wrong way by binge eating.  Her father's death was a very traumatic thing that happened in her life.  Therefore, she was not prepared to deal with this traumatic experience so she turned to the comfort of binging and purging.  Early trauma experiences such as death, illnesses, and rape have all been linked to the formation of eating disorders in teens and young adults.  Not only can these traumatic events be the cause of eating disorders in the future, but they can wait and show up in an individual's middle to late adulthood.

Awards and achievements
Isinglass Teen Book Award, 2008
Golden Sower Award, 2007
Black-Eyed Susan Award nominee, 2007–2008
Book Sense Pick, 2005
Milkweed Prize for Children's Literature, 2004

References

2004 American novels
American children's novels
2004 children's books
Novels about eating disorders
Milkweed Editions books